5th Edition of The WBFJA Award, also known as 'Cinemar Samabartan' (Convocation of Cinema or Carnival of Films) will take place on 16th January 2022 honoring best movies of the past two years.

Theme & Outline 
Called 'Cinemar Samabartan' (Convocation of Cinema or Carnival of Films), the festival will have the tag line 'Cinemar Moja Cinemar Hall E' (you can truly enjoy the charm of films by watching on big screen) as the campaign to bring back the audience to the cinema halls and multiplexes which is incomparable with OTT.

Lifetime Achievement 
The Lifetime Achievement award for WBFJA 2021 was given to Victor Banerjee.

Nominations

Best Film

Best Director

Best Actor (Male) 

◆ Other Best Actor Winners

Best Actor (Female)

Most Popular Actor

Most Popular Film

Best Supporting Actor (Male)

Best Supporting Actor (female)

Most Promosing Actress

Most Promising Director

Best Actor in a Negetive Role

Best Actor in a Comic Role

Best Music Director

Best Playback Singer (Male)

Best Playback Singer (Female)

Best Lyrics

Best Screenplay

Best Cinematographer

Best Editor

Best Art Director

Best Background Score

Best Sound Designer

Best Makeup

Best Costume

References 

West Bengal Film Journalists' Association Awards
Indian awards